Lilambo is a village in  the Ruvuma Region of southwestern Tanzania. It is located along the A19 road, to the east of  Likuyufusi and west of Songea.

References

Populated places in Ruvuma Region